Alamota is an unincorporated community in Lane County, Kansas, United States.

History
Alamota was a station and shipping point on a division of the Atchison, Topeka and Santa Fe Railway.

A post office was established in Alamota in 1877, closed in 1894, reopened in 1903, and closed permanently in 1992.

Education
The community is served by Dighton USD 482 public school district.

References

Further reading

External links
 Lane County maps: Current, Historic, KDOT

Unincorporated communities in Lane County, Kansas
Unincorporated communities in Kansas